Straight to the Sky is a 1989 album by Lisa Lisa and Cult Jam. It is best known for the lead track "Little Jackie Wants to Be a Star", which reached number 29 on the US Billboard Hot 100. Two further singles were released from the album; "Just Git It Together" and "Kiss Your Tears Away".

Track listing

Production
Written, arranged and produced by Full Force
Engineered by Scott Goofman, Tony Maserati and Vicki Nemarich

Charts

References 

Lisa Lisa and Cult Jam albums
1989 albums
Columbia Records albums
Albums produced by Full Force